Jonathan Kenneth Corupe (born January 18, 1980) is a Canadian retired professional ice hockey player.

During the 2013–14 GET-ligaen season, Corupe scored 66 points (30 goals and 36 assists) to tie with Morten Ask for the most points scored in the GET-ligaen.

Career statistics

References

External links

1980 births
Living people
Birmingham Bulls players
Bolzano HC players
Canadian ice hockey centres
Columbus Cottonmouths (ECHL) players
Ice hockey people from Ontario
Johnstown Chiefs players
Lørenskog IK players
Louisiana IceGators (ECHL) players
Odessa Jackalopes players
Saint John Flames players
Sportspeople from Hamilton, Ontario
Wheeling Nailers players
Wilkes-Barre/Scranton Penguins players
Canadian expatriate ice hockey players in Norway
Canadian expatriate ice hockey players in Italy
Canadian expatriate ice hockey players in the United States